Purwasaba is a village in Mandiraja Town, Banjarnegara Regency, Central Java Province, Indonesia. This village has an area of 282,16 hectares and a  population of 5.665 inhabitants in 2010.

References

External link
 BPS Kabupaten Banjarnegara
 Banjarnegara regency official website

Banjarnegara Regency
Villages in Central Java